Sanjeewa Roshan (born 4 October 1982) is a Sri Lankan former cricketer. He played in 56 first-class and 35 List A matches between 2000/01 and 2010/11. He made his Twenty20 debut on 17 August 2004, for Panadura Sports Club in the 2004 SLC Twenty20 Tournament.

References

External links
 

1982 births
Living people
Sri Lankan cricketers
Moratuwa Sports Club cricketers
Panadura Sports Club cricketers
Sebastianites Cricket and Athletic Club cricketers
Place of birth missing (living people)